NGC 436 is an open cluster located in the constellation Cassiopeia. It was discovered on November 3, 1787 by William Herschel. It was described by Dreyer as a "cluster, small, irregular figure, pretty compressed."

References

0436
17871103
Cassiopeia (constellation)
Open clusters